This is a list of Catholic schools in New York State.

New York (state)
 Academy of Our Lady of Good Counsel High School, White Plains
 Academy of Saint Joseph, Brentwood
 Academy of the Holy Names, Albany
 Albertus Magnus High School, Bardonia
 Aquinas Institute, Rochester
 Archangel School, Rochester
 Archbishop Stepinac High School, White Plains
 Bishop Maginn High School, Albany
 Blessed Sacrament School, Albany
 Blessed Sacrament School, Johnson City
 Blessed Sacrament School, Syracuse
 Blessed Virgin Mary Mother of God Church and Academy, Warners
 Buffalo Academy of the Sacred Heart, Eggertsville
 Canisius High School, Buffalo
 Cardinal O'Hara High School, Tonawanda
 Catholic Central High School, Troy
 Chaminade High School, Mineola
 Christ the King School, Albany
 Christian Brothers Academy, Albany
 Christian Brothers Academy, Syracuse
 Cohoes Catholic School, Cohoes
 DeSales Catholic School, Lockport
 Holy Angels Academy, Buffalo
 Holy Cross Academy, Oneida Castle
 Holy Cross School, Albany
 Holy Family Catholic School, Norwich
 Holy Family Regional School, Commack
 Holy Rosary School, Hawthorne
 Holy Spirit School, East Greenbush
 Holy Trinity Diocesan High School, Hicksville
 Holy Trinity School, Utica
 Immaculata Academy, Hamburg
 Immaculate Conception School, Ithaca
 Immaculate Heart Central School, Watertown
 Iona Preparatory School, New Rochelle
 John A. Coleman Catholic High School, Hurley
 John F. Kennedy High School, Somers
 John S. Burke Catholic High School, Goshen
 Kellenberg Memorial High School, Uniondale
 La Salle Institute, Troy
 Maria Regina High School, Hartsdale
 McQuaid Jesuit High School, Rochester
 Mount Saint Mary Academy, Kenmore
 Mother Teresa Academy, Clifton Park
 Northeastern Catholic Junior High School, Rochester
 Notre Dame Elementary School, Utica
 Notre Dame Jr/Sr High School, Utica
 Notre Dame-Bishop Gibbons School, Schenectady
 Our Lady of Lourdes, Malverne
 Our Lady of Lourdes High School, Poughkeepsie
 Our Lady of Mercy Academy, Syosset
 Our Lady of Mercy High School, Rochester
 Our Lady of Mercy School, Hicksville
 Our Lady of Peace School, Lynbrook
 Our Lady of Perpetual Help School, Lindenhurst
 Our Lady of Providence, Central Islip
 Our Lady of Sorrows-Seton Campus, Endicott
 Our Lady of the Hamptons School, Southampton
 Our Lady of the Miraculous Medal School, Ridgewood
 Our Lady of the Sacred Heart, Buffalo
 Our Lady of Victory School, Lackawanna
 Our Lady of Victory School, Troy (closed 2009)
 Our Mother of Sorrows School, Rochester
 Queen of the Rosary Academy, Amityville
 Regina Coeli School, Hyde Park
 Sacred Heart Academy, Hempstead
 Sacred Heart Cathedral School, Rochester
 Sacred Heart School, Troy
 Saint Aidan School, Williston Park
 Saint Ambrose School, Latham
 Saint Andrew Country Day School, Kenmore
 Saint Anthony's High School, South Huntington
 Saint Anthony School, Nanuet, New York
 Saint Augustine's School, Troy
 Saint Bartholomew School, Yonkers
 Saint Benedict's School, Amherst
 Saint Brigid's Regional Catholic School, Watervliet
 Saint Casimir School, Yonkers
 Saint Casimir's Regional School, Albany
 Saint Charles Borromeo School, Rochester
 Saint Christopher School, Tonawanda
 Saint Christopher's Parochial School, Baldwin
 Saint Clements Regional Catholic School, Saratoga Springs
 Saint Denis /Saint Columba School, Hopewell Junction
 Saint Dominic High School, Oyster Bay
 Saint Edmund Preparatory High School
 Saint Elizabeth Ann Seton Regional School, Wantagh
 Saint Elizabeth Ann Seton School, Shrub Oak
 Saint Eugene School, Yonkers
 Saint Francis De Sales Regional Catholic School, Herkimer
 Saint Francis – Saint Stephen's School, Geneva
 Saint Gregory the Great, Bellerose
 Saint Helen School, Rochester
 Saint Helen's School, Schenectady
 Saint James Middle School, Middle City
 Saint John Bosco, Seneca Falls
 Saint John of Rochester School, Fairport
 Saint John the Baptist, Yonkers
 Saint John the Baptist Diocesan High School, West Islip
 Saint John the Evangelist School, Binghamton
 Saint Josaphat School, Cheektowaga
 Saint Joseph School (Endicott, New York)
 Saint Joseph School, Middletown
 Saint Joseph School, Millbrook
 Saint Joseph's Collegiate Institute, Kenmore
 Saint Joseph's – Saint John's Academy, Rensselaer (closed 2003)
 Saint Joseph's School, Penfield
 Saint Jude the Apostle School, Wynantskill
 Saint Madeleine Sophie Catholic School, Schenectady
 Saint Margaret School, Pearl River
 Saint Martin DePorres School, Poughkeepsie
 Saint Mary Gate of Heaven School
 Saint Mary of The Snow, Saugerties
 Saint Mary's School, Canandaigua
 Saint Mary's School, Cortland
 Saint Mary's School, Oneonta
 Saint Mary's School for the Deaf
 Saint Michael School
 Saint Michael's School, Newark
 Saint Monica School, Rochester
 Saint Patrick School, Owego
 Saint Patrick School, Bay Shore
 Saint Paul's School, Kenmore
 Saint Peter School, Haverstraw
 Saint Peter's School, Hyde Park
 Saint Peter's School, Liberty
 Saint Pius X School, Loudonville
 Saint Pius X School, Rochester
 Saint Teresa of Avila School, Albany
 Saint Thérèse Chapel and Academy, Nicholville
 Saints Cyril and Methodius School, Deer Park
 Salesian High School, New Rochelle
 Saratoga Central Catholic Junior-Senior High School, Saratoga Springs
 School of the Holy Child, Rye
 Seton Catholic Central High School, Binghamton
 Siena Catholic Academy, Brighton
 Southtowns Catholic School, Lake View
 Turner Carroll High School, Buffalo
 Utica Catholic Academy (closed 1976)
 Villa Maria Academy, Buffalo

New York City

The Bronx
 Academy of Mount Saint Ursula
 All Hallows High School
 Aquinas High School
 Cardinal Hayes High School
 Cardinal Spellman High School
 Fordham Preparatory School
 Holy Cross School
 Holy Family School
 Holy Rosary School
 Immaculate Conception School
 Marie Smith Urban Street Academy
 Monsignor Scanlan High School
 Mount Saint Michael Academy
 Preston High School
 Sacred Heart School
 Saint Barnabas Elementary School
 Saint Catharine Academy
 Saint Francis Xavier School
 Saint Pius X High School
 Saint Raymond Academy for Girls
 Saint Raymond High School for Boys
 Saints Peter and Paul
 Villa Maria Academy

Brooklyn

Elementary Schools and Academies
 Blessed Sacrament Catholic Academy
 Brooklyn Jesuit Prep
 Good Shepherd Catholic Academy
 Holy Angels Catholic Academy (merging into Bay Ridge Catholic Academy, September 2020)
 Midwood Catholic Academy
 Our Lady of Grace Catholic Academy
 Our Lady of Perpetual Help Catholic Academy of Brooklyn
 Our Lady of Trust Catholic Academy
 Queen of the Rosary Catholic Academy
 Saint Anselm Catholic Academy (merging into Bay Ridge Catholic Academy, September 2020)
 Saint Athanasius Catholic Academy
 Saint Bernadette Catholic Academy
 Saint Bernard Catholic Academy
 Saint Brigid – Saint Frances Cabrini Catholic Academy
 Saint Catherine of Genoa ~ St. Therese of Lisieux Catholic Academy
 Saint Edmund School
 Saint Ephrem Catholic Academy
 Saint Francis of Assisi Catholic Academy
 Saint Francis Xavier Catholic Academy – Early Childhood
 Saint Gregory the Great Catholic Academy
 Saint Joseph the Worker Catholic Academy
 Saint Mark Catholic Academy
 Saint Patrick Catholic Academy
 Saint Peter Catholic Academy
 Saint Saviour Catholic Academy
 Saint Stanislaus Kostka Catholic Academy
 Salve Regina Catholic Academy
 Visitation Catholic Academy

High Schools
 Bishop Loughlin Memorial High School
 Fontbonne Hall Academy
 Nazareth Regional High School
 Saint Edmund Preparatory High School
 Saint Saviour High School
 Xaverian High School

Manhattan
 Academy of Saint Joseph, Greenwich Village
 Cathedral High School
 Convent of the Sacred Heart
 Cristo Rey New York
 De La Salle Academy
 Dominican Academy
 Guardian Angel School
 Holy Child Middle School
 Holy Name School
 Mother Cabrini High School (closed 2014)
 Notre Dame School
 Our Lady of Pompeii School
 Our Lady Queen of Angels Catholic Elementary School, Harlem
 Sacred Heart of Jesus School
 Saint Ann, The Personal School
 Saint Brigid School
 Saint Jean Baptiste High School
 Saint Vincent Ferrer High School
 Xavier High School

Queens

Elementary Schools and Academies
 Divine Wisdom Catholic Academy
 Holy Child Jesus Catholic Academy
 Holy Family Catholic Academy
 Holy Trinity Catholic Academy
 Immaculate Conception Catholic Academy, Astoria
 Immaculate Conception Catholic Academy, Jamaica
 Incarnation Catholic Academy
 Notre Dame Catholic Academy
 Our Lady's Catholic Academy
 Our Lady of Fatima School
 Our Lady of Grace Catholic Academy
 Our Lady of Hope Catholic Academy
 Our Lady of Mercy Catholic Academy
 Our Lady of Perpetual Help Catholic Academy
 Our Lady of Sorrows Catholic Academy
 Our Lady of the Blessed Sacrament Catholic Academy
 Our Lady of the Snows Catholic Academy
 Our Lady Queen of Martyrs Catholic Academy
 Resurrection-Ascension Catholic Academy
 Sacred Heart Catholic Academy, Bayside
 Sacred Heart Catholic Academy, Cambria Heights
 Sacred Heart Catholic Academy, Glendale
 Saint Adalbert Catholic Academy
 Saint Andrew Avellino Catholic Academy
 Saint Bartholomew Catholic Academy
 Saint Clare Catholic Academy
 Saint Elizabeth Catholic Academy
 Saint Francis of Assisi Catholic Academy
 Saint Gregory the Great Catholic Academy
 Saint Helen Catholic Academy
 Saint Joan of Arc School
 Saint Joseph Catholic Academy
 Saint Kevin Catholic Academy
 Saint Leo Catholic Academy
 Saint Luke School
 Saint Margaret Catholic Academy
 Saint Mary Gate of Heaven Catholic Academy
 Saint Matthias Catholic Academy
 Saint Mel Catholic Academy
 Saint Michael's Catholic Academy
 Saint Nicholas of Tolentine Catholic Academy
 Saint Rose of Lima Catholic Academy
 Saint Sebastian Catholic Academy
 Saint Stanislaus Kostka Catholic Academy of Queens
 Saint Thomas the Apostle Catholic Academy
 Saints Joachim and Anne School

High Schools
 Archbishop Molloy High School
 Cathedral Preparatory School and Seminary
 Christ the King Regional High School
 Holy Cross High School
 The Mary Louis Academy
 Monsignor McClancy Memorial High School
 Saint Agnes Academic High School
 Saint Francis Preparatory School
 Saint John's Preparatory School

Staten Island
 Blessed Sacrament School
 Monsignor Farrell High School
 Moore Catholic High School
 Notre Dame Academy
 Saint John Villa Academy (closed 2018)
 Saint Joseph by-the-Sea High School
 Saint Joseph Hill Academy
 Saint Teresa School

See also
 List of schools in the Roman Catholic Archdiocese of New York
 List of closed schools in the Roman Catholic Archdiocese of New York

References

Catholic schools in New York (state)
New York
Catholic